Kathy Skroch is an American politician serving as a member of the 26th district from the North Dakota House of Representatives. Elected in November 2016, she assumed office on December 1, 2016.

Early life and education 
Skroch was born in Browns Valley, Minnesota. She earned a nursing assistant certificate from the Minnesota State Community and Technical College.

Career 
Outside of politics, Skroch works as a certified nursing assistant. She also owns Vinnie's Mud Bog, a plot of land in Richland County, North Dakota used for off-roading. She was elected to the North Dakota House of Representatives in November 2016 and assumed office on December 1, 2018.

References 

Living people
People from Browns Valley, Minnesota
Republican Party members of the North Dakota House of Representatives
Women state legislators in North Dakota
People from Richland County, North Dakota
21st-century American politicians
21st-century American women politicians
Year of birth missing (living people)